"Urgent" is a song by the British-American rock band Foreigner, and the first single from their album 4 in 1981.

Background

Producer Robert John "Mutt" Lange wanted to hear every music idea singer Mick Jones had recorded on tape, no matter how embarrassing. One of these ideas was the opening riff for what would become "Urgent". “I had the riff starting out," Jones recalled. "And I said, 'That’s like an experimental instrumental thing that I’m working on.’ He said, ‘No, it isn’t anymore -– let’s take that one, because that’s got a lot of potential.’ There wasn’t even a song with it.” He also said, “‘Urgent’ … was a bit of a hybrid. It was a soul song, really – a quirky kind of rock and soul combination. That album had a bunch of different departures on it from the album that preceded it, Head Games. … It was just like a musical journey.” In fact, "Urgent" was recorded with Mick Jones playing lead and rhythm guitar, including a line originally composed for Ian McDonald, who left the band in 1980.

Recording
Foreigner went into the Manhattan studio with producer Robert John "Mutt" Lange, best known at the time as producer for hard rock band AC/DC.  Foreigner's sound wasn't quite as heavy, and the band worked with then-unknown Thomas Dolby to program and play synthesizer.  Dolby's work can be heard on "Urgent", along with a saxophone solo by Motown artist Junior Walker. 

Lange was a perfectionist with Dolby, making him play some of the simple notes over and over until they were perfect. On the other hand, Lange used Junior Walker's first take, appreciating its raw, rough edges. Lange was a fan of Dolby's earlier work, and Dolby had a demo of a song called "Urges" where he sang "urges, urges...". Lange asked Dolby for permission to incorporate this into a Foreigner song, which was then turned into the lyric "Urgent, urgent...". Dolby was a little surprised when he heard the finished song, but later felt glad to have positively influenced the track.

Walker recorded at least 12 versions of the saxophone solo but ultimately the first version was used in the final release, despite some rough edges.

Jones has rated "Urgent" as one of his 11 favorite Foreigner songs, specifically praising Walker's sax solo and Dolby's "freaky" riffs.

Reception
Billboard said that "Guitars and keyboards supply the rhythmic punch on this tasty rocker." Billboard reviewer Gary Graff rated "Urgent" to be Foreigner's all-time greatest song, particularly praising Dolby's synthesizer and Walker's saxophone but also saying that the song "would have been killer" even without the sax solo.  Record World said that "From the opening keyboard throbs to Lou Gramm's lusty vocal growls to Jr. Walker's sax heat, this rocker...is headed to the top of AOR-pop playlists."  Classic Rock History critic Brian Kachejian rated it as Foreigner's 6th best song, saying that the "rowdy bouncy feel...is highly addictive."

Chart performance
The song entered the U.S. pop charts the week ending July 4, 1981, and reached #4 on the Billboard Hot 100 chart, holding that spot for the entire month of September. "Urgent" hit #1 on the Billboard Rock Tracks chart, a position it held for four weeks.

"Urgent" was the most successful single from the 4 album on album-oriented rock radio, though it was outsold by the album's later single, "Waiting for a Girl Like You", which reached #2 on the Billboard Hot 100 in November 1981 and remained at that spot through the end of the following January, for a total of ten weeks, being certified Gold.  4 went Gold and Platinum during the chart run of the "Urgent" single.  The album has since been certified multi-platinum by the RIAA, for selling over six million copies in the U.S. alone.

The song was Foreigner's second-best-selling single (after "I Want to Know What Love Is") in both Canada and Sweden, reaching #1 in Canada in September 1981 and #20 in Sweden in March 1982.  In Australia, "Urgent" peaked at #24 in November 1981, but remained in the Top 50 for 24 weeks.  In the UK, the song reached only #54 upon its first release in 1981.  In 1982, after "Waiting for a Girl Like You" went Top Ten there, "Urgent" was re-released, this time reaching only slightly higher, peaking at #45.

Chart history

Weekly charts

Year-end charts

Track listings
1981: "Urgent" b/w "Girl on the Moon" (Atlantic 3831) US 7" single
1981: "Urgent" b/w "Girl on the Moon" (Atlantic 11665) UK 7" single
1982: "Urgent" b/w "Head Games" (live) (Atlantic 11728) UK 7" single
1982: "Urgent" b/w "Head Games" (live)/"Hot Blooded" (live) (Atlantic 11728) UK 12" single

Personnel 
Foreigner
 Lou Gramm – lead vocals
 Mick Jones – guitars, backing vocals 
 Rick Wills – bass, backing vocals
 Dennis Elliott – drums

Additional personnel
 Thomas Dolby – main synthesizers
 Michael Fonfara – keyboard textures
 Mark Rivera – saxophone
 Junior Walker – saxophone solo

Other versions
Foreigner performs a live version of the song on the 1993 album Classic Hits Live.

A live concert version by the 2005 incarnation of the band, featuring Kelly Hansen on vocals, can be heard on the release Extended Versions.

Junior Walker covered the song and recorded it using  Motown Records. It was featured in the 1985 movie "Desperately Seeking Susan."

Shannon version

Electropop/R&B singer Shannon recorded a version of the Foreigner hit for her 1985 album Do You Wanna Get Away. Foreigner's label, Atlantic Records, distributed Mirage, the label for the Shannon release.  The song was the album's fourth single, peaking at #68 for two weeks on Billboard's R&B Singles chart in November and December 1985.  A 12" remix of the mid-tempo track was not the major dance hit of her previous releases.

Track listings 
12" Single
 Urgent - 5:10	
 Do You Wanna Get Away - 4:54

Charts

Radio DCS
Austrian band Radio DCS released a cover version of the song on their debut album I Try My Best To Mainstream and entered the European alternative charts (WEEK 49 . December 3, 2012) at position #8.

See also
List of RPM number-one singles of 1981
List of Billboard Mainstream Rock number-one songs of the 1980s

References

External links
Foreigner Official Website
Foreigner singles charts

1981 singles
1981 songs
1985 singles
Foreigner (band) songs
Shannon (singer) songs
RPM Top Singles number-one singles
Number-one singles in South Africa
Song recordings produced by Robert John "Mutt" Lange
Songs written by Mick Jones (Foreigner)
Atlantic Records singles
Mirage Records singles
Song recordings produced by Mick Jones (Foreigner)